Ellen Carlson (1929 – July 15, 2022) was a columnist for the St. Paul Pioneer Press and with colleague Eleanor Ostman, won the 1994 James Beard Foundation Journalism Award.

Biography
Carlson was born Ellen Therese Holl in Saint Paul, Minnesota grew up with eight siblings in Forest Lake, Minnesota. She graduated from St. Catherine University and then taught science and home economics in a high school. In 1953, she married Warren Benhardt Carlson. Together they had five children. She wrote her column “Household Forum” for 24 years, starting after her youngest child started school.

She died on July 15, 2022 in Roseville, Minnesota.

References

1929 births
2022 deaths
Journalists from Minnesota
James Beard Foundation Award winners
St. Catherine University alumni
Writers from Saint Paul, Minnesota
American women columnists
People from Forest Lake, Minnesota
People from Roseville, Minnesota